Bibliography of works on the United States military and LGBT+ topics is a list of non-fiction literary works on the subject of the United States Armed Forces and LGBT+ subjects. LGBT+ includes any types of people which may be considered "Queer"; in other words, homosexual people, bisexual people, transgender people, intersex people, androgynous people, cross-dressers, questioning people and others.

General

Sexuality

Transgenderism

Intersex

Cross-dressing

Androgyny

See also
 Bibliography of works on wartime cross-dressing
 Outline of LGBT topics
 Don't ask, don't tell
 Bibliography of United States military history

External links
 Further Reading: Transgender Soldiers

+
LGBT-related lists
Bibliographies of wars and conflicts